Lorris May Wimberly Sr. (1898 - 1962) was a state legislator in Louisiana. Rush Wimberly was his father. He married Dorothy Knox. He served as Speaker of the Louisiana House of Representatives.

References

1898 births
Speakers of the Louisiana House of Representatives
Democratic Party members of the Louisiana House of Representatives
1962 deaths
People from Bienville Parish, Louisiana